Vikingarnas julparty is a 1979 Vikingarna studio album. The side A consists of Christmas songs.

Track listing

Side A
I kväll jag tänder ett ljus
Bella Notte
Bjällerklang (Jingle Bells)
Låt mig få tända ett ljus (Mozarts vaggsång)
Hej, mitt vinterland
Ser du stjärnan i det blå (When You Wish upon a Star)
Sjömansjul på Hawaii
Jag drömmer om en jul hemma (White Christmas)

Side B
Hav och himmel
Leende guldbruna ögon (Beautiful Brown Eyes)
Mississippi
Moskva (Moskau)
Fernando
Inför prästen
En gång är ingen gång (Han är min sång och glädje)
Charlie Brown

Charts

References 

1979 Christmas albums
Christmas albums by Swedish artists
Vikingarna (band) albums
Swedish-language albums